University Heights is a city in Johnson County, Iowa, United States. It is part of the Iowa City, Iowa Metropolitan Statistical Area. The population was 1,228 at the time of the 2020 census. It is an enclave surrounded by Iowa City, located near the campus of the University of Iowa. University Heights is very close to Kinnick Stadium.

According to The Gazette (Cedar Rapids), University Heights has a reputation among area motorists as a speed trap.

History

At the turn of the 20th century, the area of present-day University Heights was known as West Lucas Township and consisted of several small farms and properties. At that time, the University of Iowa and Iowa City at large had not yet expanded westward past the Iowa River.

In the early 1920s, brothers Lee and George Koser began purchasing and developing the land that became the city of University Heights, anticipating the westward expansion of the University and the city. With the construction of the University's General Hospital in 1928 and Kinnick Stadium in 1929, those predictions came true. By 1933, the City of Iowa City began annexing land on the west side of the river and in 1935, the city of University Heights was incorporated. By the 1960s, most of the remaining lots west of Sunset St. were developed and the land surrounding University Heights had been annexed by Iowa City, limiting future growth.

All 241 lots in the original subdivisions of University Heights were set up with restrictive covenants stating that the lots were "for the sole use and benefit of the Caucasian Race and no lot or parcel shall be sold, owned, or used or occupied by the people of any other race, except when used in the capacity of a servant or helper". For 218 of the lots, Lee, Reka, George, and Tessie Koser were responsible for the language, while for the remaining 23, L.R. and Elizabeth Leamer were responsible. These racially restrictive covenants were legally enforceable until the Shelley vs. Kraemer US Supreme Court decision in 1948.

Geography
University Heights is located at  (41.653666, -91.558167).

Demographics

2010 census
As of the census of 2010, there were 1,051 people, 474 households, and 251 families residing in the city. The racial makeup of the city was 93.5% White, 1.0% African American, 3.3% Asian, 0.3% Pacific Islander, 0.1% from other races, and 1.7% from two or more races. Hispanic or Latino of any race were 2.8% of the population.

There were 474 households, of which 21.9% had children under the age of 18 living with them, 44.9% were married couples living together, 5.7% had a female householder with no husband present, 2.3% had a male householder with no wife present, and 47.0% were non-families. 31.2% of all households were made up of individuals, and 5.2% had someone living alone who was 65 years of age or older. The average household size was 2.22 and the average family size was 2.78.

The median age in the city was 30.5 years. 17.1% of residents were under the age of 18; 17.8% were between the ages of 18 and 24; 32.3% were from 25 to 44; 21.5% were from 45 to 64; and 11.3% were 65 years of age or older. The gender makeup of the city was 50.6% male and 49.4% female.

2000 census
As of the census of 2000, there were 987 people, 467 households, and 254 families residing in the city. The racial makeup of the city was 95.95% White, 0.91% African American, 1.22% Asian, 0.10% Pacific Islander, 0.41% from other races, and 1.42% from two or more races. Hispanic or Latino of any race were 1.62% of the population.

There were 467 households, out of which 22.1% had children under the age of 18 living with them, 46.9% were married couples living together, 4.5% had a female householder with no husband present, and 45.6% were non-families. 35.8% of all households were made up of individuals, and 6.9% had someone living alone who was 65 years of age or older. The average household size was 2.11 and the average family size was 2.74.

18.1% are under the age of 18, 10.7% from 18 to 24, 36.1% from 25 to 44, 22.5% from 45 to 64, and 12.6% who were 65 years of age or older. The median age was 36 years. For every 100 females, there were 101.4 males. For every 100 females age 18 and over, there were 97.1 males.

The median income for a household in the city was $48,929, and the median income for a family was $79,044. Males had a median income of $48,542 versus $36,397 for females. The per capita income for the city was $32,484. About 4.6% of families and 11.1% of the population were below the poverty line, including 5.0% of those under age 18 and none of those age 65 or over.

Education 
University Heights contains one school. Horn Elementary School is part of the Iowa City Community School District. Students in University Heights attend Northwest Junior High School and West High School.

A small portion of the University of Iowa's Finkbine Golf Course is contained in northwest University Heights.

Parks and Recreation 
There are 11.8 and 0.7 acre wooded parcels owned by the city at the very north end of University Heights. The city does not operate any parks.

There is an oversized sidewalk which runs along the north side of Melrose Avenue.

Special election
In 2009, the developer Jeff Maxwell proposed a large development to be built on the present site of St. Andrew Presbyterian Church. The proposal was considered by the zoning commission and disapproved. It was sent to the city council which also disapproved the proposed rezoning. The 2009 city election reflected the high level of interest in the development as ten candidates ran for the city council and voters turned out in record numbers.

Four of the five council members elected subsequently supported the Maxwell development. One of them, Amy Moore, resigned from the city council and was replaced by Jim Lane by appointment. A petition for a special election obtained more than the minimum signatures. The two candidates in the January 11th election were Jim Lane, the appointed incumbent, and Rosanne Hopson, a longtime resident.

The final turnout of 495 set a record for city elections in University Heights. Hopson received 262 votes (53%) and Lane received 233 (47%).

References

External links
 City of University Heights
 University Heights Police Department This link is no longer valid.

Cities in Johnson County, Iowa
Cities in Iowa
Iowa City metropolitan area
1935 establishments in Iowa